Huntingdon and Peterborough County Council was the county council of Huntingdon and Peterborough in the east of England. It came into its powers on 1 April 1965 and was abolished on 1 April 1974. The county council was based at Walden House, Huntingdon. It was amalgamated with Cambridgeshire and Isle of Ely County Council to form an enlarged Cambridgeshire County Council in 1974.

References

Former county councils of England
Local authorities in Cambridgeshire
Local education authorities in England